Red Dragon may refer to:

Entertainment
The Red Dragon (magazine), a Welsh historical and literary magazine published 1882–1887
 Red Dragon (novel), a 1981 book by Thomas Harris
 Manhunter (film), a 1986 film directed by Michael Mann based on the novel Red Dragon by Thomas Harris
 Red Dragon (2002 film), a film directed by Brett Ratner based on the novel by Thomas Harris
 Francis Dolarhyde, the fictional serial killer from the novel Red Dragon by Thomas Harris and films based on it
 Red Dragon (1965 film), the American release title of A 009 missione Hong Kong, a West German and Italian spy film directed by Ernst Hofbauer
 The Red Dragon (film), a 1946 Charlie Chan mystery film 
 Red Dragon (musician) (1966–2015), Jamaican deejay, born Leroy May
 Capital South Wales, a radio station serving Cardiff, Wales formerly known as 103.2 & 97.4 Red Dragon
 Red Dragon, a fictional pirate ship from the 2017 film Pirates of the Caribbean: Dead Men Tell No Tales

Games and sports
 Red Dragon (role-playing fiction), a Japanese tabletop game, role-playing fiction and art phenomenon 
 Red dragon (Dungeons & Dragons), a type of dragon in the Dungeons & Dragons roleplaying game
 reDRagon, a professional wrestling tag team
 Wargame: Red Dragon, 2014 real-time strategy video game

Technology
 SpaceX Red Dragon, a canceled robotic lander mission to Mars by SpaceX
 Red Dragon (1595), a 16th-century English gun ship
 The Red Dragon (train), a British express train 1950–1965
 Red Dragon, a professional cinema camera of Red Digital Cinema Camera Company

Other
 Red Dragon (Ambazonian militia), an separatist militia in the breakaway state of Ambazonia (Southern Cameroons)
 "The great red dragon", Satan as described in Revelation 12:3
 The Great Red Dragon paintings, a series of paintings by the English poet and painter William Blake
 Red Dragon Society, a secret society at New York University
 A mahjong tile with a red Chinese character for "center" on it
 A red Chinese dragon
 Grand Grimoire, a black magic grimoire, also known as The Red Dragon
 Welsh Dragon, a national symbol of Wales. Thus, "red dragon" in Welsh culture may refer to:
 The flag of Wales
 Y Fenni cheese, a Welsh cheese, also known as "Red Dragon" when coated in red wax
 Cortland Red Dragons, athletic teams of SUNY Cortland

See also
 
 Legend of the Red Dragon (LORD), an online BBS game
 Great red dragon (disambiguation)
 Dragon (disambiguation)
 Red (disambiguation)